Jonathan Wright (30 January 1925 – 22 February 2015) was an English footballer who played as an inside forward in the Football League for Darlington. He made his debut on 1 March 1947, standing in for Charlie Stubbs at inside right in a 4–1 win against Rochdale, and made three more appearances towards the end of that season. He had a run of 11 matches at the end of the following season, and played his final first-team match in September 1948. He went on to play for North-Eastern League club Horden Colliery Welfare.

Wright was born in Newburn, Northumberland, in 1925 and died in Durham in 2015 at the age of 90.

References

1925 births
2015 deaths
People from Newburn
Footballers from Tyne and Wear
English footballers
Association football inside forwards
Darlington F.C. players
Darlington Town F.C. players
English Football League players